Executive suite may refer to:

In Design:
 Executive suite, a type of office space

In Culture:
 Executive Suite, a novel by Cameron Hawley
 Executive Suite, a 1954 film starring William Holden
 Executive Suite (TV series), a 1970s American television program
 Executive Suite (video game), a DOS computer game released in 1982
 Executive Suite, a record by the British band The Wiseguys
 Executive Suite, a 1982 album by jazz musicians The L.A. Four

Other uses:
 Clark Tower Executive Suites, a building in Memphis, Tennessee